James Essex Holloway CBE (born 1948) is a British art historian, and was director of the Scottish National Portrait Gallery from 1997 until 2012.

Education and personal life
Holloway was born in Westminster in 1948 and educated at the Courtauld Institute (University of London).

Holloway enjoys motorcycles and also plays the French Horn.

Career

Early career
In 1972, Holloway became a research assistant at the National Gallery of Scotland. Following this Holloway became Assistant Keeper at the National Museum of Wales in 1980. Holloway then joined the Scottish National Portrait Gallery in 1983 as a Deputy Keeper.

Directorship of the Scottish National Portrait Gallery
In 1997, Holloway was appointed as Director of the Museum. While Holloway was director, a successful campaign to raise funds to secure the Diana and Actaeon painting for the nation undertaken. In an article with the Scotsman at the time of his retirement, it was reported "the purchase of an Allan Ramsay portrait of philosopher David Hume is among his fondest memories".

A large refurbishment was also undertaken during his tenure. Formerly the building was shared with the National Museum of Antiquities, now the Museum of Scotland, until they moved to a new building in 2009. Following this move the refurbishment of the Portrait Gallery began with funding from the Scottish Government and the Heritage Lottery Fund, amongst others. The cost of the refurbishment was £17.6 million.

Holloway retired from the position of Director of the Scottish National Portrait Gallery in 2012.

Career since directorship of the Scottish National Portrait Gallery
Since retirement, Holloway has become the chairman of the Board of Trustees of the Abbotsford Trust responsible for Abbotsford House, the former home of Sir Walter Scott. Holloway is also a Trustee of the Fleming Wyfold Foundation and of the Historic Scotland Foundation.

Honours
Holloway was appointed a Commander of the Order of the British Empire (CBE) in the 2012 New Year Honours.

Bibliography

Books

References

1948 births
Living people
Alumni of the Courtauld Institute of Art
Commanders of the Order of the British Empire
Scottish art historians
Scottish curators